The Market for Alternative Investment (MAI or mai) is a stock exchange of Thailand which was established by the Stock Exchange of Thailand (SET) in 1998 under the Securities Exchange of Thailand Act as an alternative stock market for small and medium-sized enterprises. It officially commenced operation on 21 June 1999. It is located in Khlong Toei, Bangkok.

The mai operates independently under the supervision of the SET's board of directors. The mai committee sets its policies and oversees the market's operation and front office duties such as stock listing and public relations. Back office functions, such as the trading system, clearing and settlement procedures, trading surveillance and supervision, as well as disclosure requirements, will be based entirely on existing Stock Exchange of Thailand operations.

Vision 
"We strive to be the right and efficient exchange creating value for high potential, innovative and ventured companies in ASEAN."

Milestones 

11 November 1998:

The Office of the Securities and Exchange Commission approves in principle the establishment of
the market for listing securities of small and medium enterprises by the Stock Exchange of Thailand (SET).

21 June 1999:

The mai officially commenced operation. The Minister of Finance emphasized the important role of the mai in supporting and strengthening Small and Medium-sized Enterprises.

16 January 2000:

Mr. Yuth Vorachattarn is appointed to be the first Managing Director of the mai. His goal is to develop the mai to be an efficient secondary market for Small and Medium-sized Enterprises, and to be a modern and dynamic market to promote international best practices for Thai businesses.

10 April 2000:

The mai announces a new listing category, “Section 2: Hi-Growth Enterprises”, to broaden the fund-raising opportunities for firms that had high growth potential even though they were relatively small, such as those in the technology industry.

17 September 2001: 

The mai starts official trading. BROOK is the first company to be actually listed on the mai	

3 September 2002:

The mai created its Index to provide investors with a valuable tool for understanding stock price movements on the mai. The index's base was the trading value of listed securities on the previous day, 2 September 2002

1 November 2004
Mr. Vichate Tantiwanich was appointed as the mai's President effective from 1 November 2004 onwards.

25 May 2005:

SET Board approves official Thai name for the Market for Alternative Investment (mai) which will be M-A-I, (pronounced as the 3 individual English letters) instead of "mai" (as in "pi").

15 February 2006:

The Board of Governors of The Stock Exchange of Thailand (SET) appoints Mr. Chanitr
Charnchainarong to be the President of the Market for Alternative Investment (mai). 
(SET Press Release No. 21/2006 dated 9 February 2006)

29 January 2007:

Multibax Public Company Limited is the 50th company to be listed on the mai
(mai Press Release No. 3/2007 dated 29 January 2007)

Listed companies
MAI listed companies as of 4 May 2010:

See also
 Economy of Thailand
 Stock Exchange of Thailand
 SET50 Index and SET100 Index

References

External links
 Official MAI website (English)
 Official MAI website (Thai)

Stock Exchange of Thailand
Stock exchanges in Thailand
Companies based in Bangkok
Financial services companies established in 1998
1998 establishments in Thailand